Tomorrow Is Another Day (Italian: Domani è un altro giorno) is a 1951 Italian melodrama film directed by Léonide Moguy and starring Pier Angeli, Aldo Silvani and Anna Maria Ferrero. It was produced as a follow-up to the hit film Tomorrow Is Too Late also directed by Moguy and starring Angeli in her screen debut. Afterwards Angeli moved to Hollywood as a contract star of MGM.

Plot 
While she was contemplating committing suicide by drowning, a young woman is stopped by a doctor whose job, all night long, is to save people who try to commit suicide. Insistently, the doctor convinces the girl to follow him around her.

Once they arrive at the hospital, the two listen to the story of a girl who, left alone, had been exploited by a man who initially showed himself good but who later turned out to be unscrupulous. The girl had tried to kill herself but was saved while her exploiter was arrested; repentant of her previous gesture, the girl repeats «I want to live, I want to live».

Another girl tells her story at home: after becoming pregnant with a young man who did not love her, she refused the abortion and decided to raise the child alone but her mother, fearing a scandal, had stolen the newborn. The young woman then took some pills, but when she woke up she found her son next to her.

After hearing other stories as well, the young woman she wanted to drown herself realizes that she has to live her life to the fullest. The title derives in fact from the popular expression, which indicates that tomorrow always holds a new dawn.

Cast
 Pier Angeli as Luisa  
 Aldo Silvani as Medico dell'ambulanza  
 Anna Maria Ferrero as Giulia  
 Laura Gore as Linda  
 Arnoldo Foà as Cesare  
 Rossana Podestà as Stefania  
 Olga Solbelli as Madre di Giulia  
 Roberto Risso as Paolo  
 Franca Tamantini as Lola  
 Mario Riva as Pasquale  
 Rina De Liguoro as Rosa  
 Bianca Doria 
 Giovanna Galletti as Madre di Luisa  
 Attilio Torelli 
 Giulio Battiferri 
 Giuseppe Chinnici as Commissario di polizia 
 Charlie Beal as Il pianista alla festa nella villa  
 Liana Billi as Madre del macellaio  
 Bianca Maria Cerasoli 
 Renato Marozzi as Ragioniere Bertolozzi  
 Nadia Niver as Una giovane madre  
 Teresa Pollio 
 Leonello Ponti 
 Lina Rossoni as Ostetrica  
 Lamberti Sorrentino as Giornalista  
 Amedeo Trilli as Mecellaio

References

Bibliography 
 Chiti, Roberto & Poppi, Roberto. Dizionario del cinema italiano: Dal 1945 al 1959. Gremese Editore, 1991.
 Moliterno, Gino. Historical Dictionary of Italian Cinema. Scarecrow Press, 2008.

External links
 
 

1951 films
1951 drama films
Italian drama films
1950s Italian-language films
Films directed by Léonide Moguy
Minerva Film films
Italian black-and-white films
Melodrama films
1950s Italian films